Louis Pierre Louvel (7 October 1783 – 7 June 1820) was the assassin of Charles Ferdinand, Duke of Berry.

Born in Versailles, Louvel was the son of a haberdasher, learned the profession of a saddler, and entered in 1806 in the service of the artillery. After the return of Napoleon from Elba in 1815 he worked as a saddler in the royal stables and also remained later in this position.

The political events of the Bourbon Restoration aroused in him the hatred against this dynasty, and he finally decided to start the extermination of the royal house with the assassination of the youngest member, the Duke of Berry. When in the night of 13 February 1820 the prince was leaving the Paris opera with his wife to lead her to the carriage, Louvel stabbed him with a knife in the right side of the body. The Duke of Berry was mortally wounded and died on the next day, but asked to pardon his murderer. An official investigation revealed that Louvel, who had been seized immediately after the assassination of the duke, had no accomplices.

He was executed by guillotine in Paris on 7 June 1820.

References
Louvel (Louis-Pierre), in: Nouvelle Biographie Générale, 1852–1866, volume 32, columns 32–37.

Notes

External links

1783 births
1820 deaths
People from Versailles
French assassins
Executed assassins
People executed by France by decapitation
People executed by guillotine
19th-century French criminals
1820 murders in France